Vainionora is a genus of lichen in the family Lecanoraceae. The genus, which was circumscribed in 1991 by German lichenologist Klaus Kalb, honours the Finnish lichenologist Edvard Vainio, who described the type species as Lecanora pallidostraminea in 1890.

Species
Vainionora aemulans 
Vainionora americana 
Vainionora flavidorufa 
Vainionora flavovirens 
Vainionora mexicana 
Vainionora nugrae 
Vainionora pallidostraminea 
Vainionora stramineopallens 
Vainionora variabilis 
Vainionora warmingii

References

Lecanoraceae
Lecanorales genera
Lichen genera
Taxa described in 1991
Taxa named by Klaus Kalb